Cincinnati Township is located in Pike County, Illinois. As of the 2010 census, its population was 31 and it contained 54 housing units. Cincinnati formed from Pleasant Vale Township sometime before 1921.

Geography

Demographics

References

External links
City-data.com
Illinois State Archives

Townships in Pike County, Illinois
Townships in Illinois